Family Meeting is a 2019 Kenyan feature film produced by Betty Kathungu Furet and written and directed by Simiyu Barasa. The film became popular in Kenya after the producers successfully crowdfunded the budget through Facebook.

Synopsis 
Jesse (Gitura Kamau), Moses (Abubakar Muindi) & his fiancée Alison (Maureen Koech) and Barbara (Akinyi Aluoch) meet at their Parents’ home (Raymond Ofula & Florence Nduta), to celebrate their 40th Wedding Anniversary but the celebration is turns into a fighting match of  siblings, Conflict and untold secrets that threaten to tear a once happy family apart.

References

Kenyan drama films
2019 films